William St Clair, Lord Herdmanston, Baron of Carfrae and Cessford, was a Scottish noble of the 14th century.

William was the son of William St Clair of Herdmanston, who had fought at the Battle of Bannockburn in 1314.

Marriage and issue
William married Margaret, daughter of William St Clair, Master of Roslin (died 1330), they are known to have had the following issue:

John St Clair of Herdmanston
James St Clair
Walter St Clair of Cessford

After the death of William, Margaret was remarried to Thomas Stewart, Earl of Angus and Chamberlain of Scotland, in 1357.

Citations

References

William
Clan Sinclair